Mirificarma eburnella is a moth of the family Gelechiidae. It is found in western, central and southern Europe and extends to North Africa, the Middle East and Russia. It is also found in California, United States, where it is presumed to have been introduced.

The wingspan is 5-7.5 mm for males and 5.5-7.5 mm for females. The head is cream. The forewings have alternating strongly contrasting, transverse zig-zag patches of cream and yellowish to ochre. Adults have been collected from March to July in Europe and in May and June in North America.

The larvae feed on Medicago sativa, Medicago lupulina, Medicago polymorpha, Trifolium repens, Trifolium hirtum, Vicia americana and Hippocrepis comosa. Larvae have been found in April and May. This species has caused severe damage to clover in California  where the larva semiskeletonizes the leaves and lightly spins two leaves together, pupating inside the folded leaves.

References

Moths described in 1775
Mirificarma
Moths of Europe
Moths of Asia
Moths of Africa
Moths of North America